Ziv is a Hebrew language word and name meaning "light" or "glow" and may refer to:

People
 Abraham Ziv (1940–2013), Israeli mathematician
 Amitai Ziv, (born 1958), Israeli physician
 Asaiah Ziv (born 1996), American hip hop musician
 Frederick Ziv (1905–2001), American broadcasting producer, founder of Ziv Television Programs
 Imri Ziv (born 1991), Israeli singer and actor
 Jacob Ziv (born 1931), Israeli computer scientist
 Simcha Zissel Ziv (1824–1898), Russian rabbi and a leader of the Musar movement
 Yiftach Ziv (born 1995), Israeli basketball player
 Yitzhak Ziv (born 1937), Israeli politician
 Yoav Ziv (born 1981), Israeli football player
 Ziv Bar-Joseph (born 1971), Israeli computational biologist
 Ziv Better (born 1965), Israeli swimmer
 Ziv Kalontarov (born 1997), Israeli swimmer
 Ziv Koren (born 1970), Israeli photojournalist
 Ziv Rubinstein (born 1970), Israeli musician

Places
 Neve Ziv, also known as Ziv HaGalil, a community settlement in northern Israel
 Ziv Medical Center, or Rebecca Sieff Hospital, a hospital in Safed, Israel

Other uses
 Iyar, a Hebrew month, called Ziv in the Bible
 Ziv Television Programs, an American company that produced syndicated television programs.

See also
 Ziwa (Aramaic) (Aramaic cognate)